Sioma District is a district of Zambia, located in Western Province on the west bank of the Zambezi River. The capital lies at Sioma.

The district was created in 2012 by the then president Michael Sata by the splitting of Shangombo District.

References

Districts of Western Province, Zambia